8 Dates is a 2008 Spanish comedy film written and directed by Peris Romano and Rodrigo Sorogoyen which features an ensemble cast of actors.

Plot 
The plot, split in 8 parts, concerns about 8 romantic vignettes depicting the evolution of 8 couple relationships.

Cast

Production 
The screenplay was penned by the helmers Peris Romano and Rodrigo Sorogoyen. The film was produced by Impala and Tesela and it had the participation of TVE and Canal+. Shooting locations included the province of Segovia.

Release 
The film was selected for the Málaga Film Festival's official selection, premiering on 10 April 2008. Distributed by Alta Classics, it was theatrically released in Spain on 18 April 2008.

Reception 
Jonathan Holland of Variety deemed the film to be "an above-average if over-derivative Spanish laffer" which "has fun written all over it and contains more than its share of astute observational comedy, but too often mistakes laffs for the merely absurd".

Irene Crespo of Cinemanía rated the film 2½ out of 5 stars, comparing it to a mix of Love Actually and Escenas de matrimonio, considering that the hook consisting of the extended cast full of known faces "gets lost along the way and soon [the film] falls into cliché, clumsy and predictable love situations".

See also 
 List of Spanish films of 2008

References 

Films shot in the province of Segovia
2008 comedy films
2008 films
Spanish romantic comedy films
2000s Spanish-language films
2000s Spanish films